Thomas Jones may refer to:

Business
 Thomas Roy Jones (1890–1985), American industrialist and management author
 Thomas V. Jones (1920–2014), American businessman
 Thomas W. Jones (born 1949), American businessman

Civil servants
 Thomas Mercer Jones (1795–1868), British-Canadian administrator
 Thomas Jones (civil servant) (1870–1955), British civil servant and educationalist

Clergy
 Thomas Jones (bishop) (c. 1550–1619), Anglican archbishop in Dublin
 Thomas Jones (priest) (died 1682), defender of Anglican Christianity
 Thomas Jones of Denbigh (1756–1820), Methodist clergyman, hymnwriter
 Thomas Jones (missionary) (1810–1849), Christian missionary to the Khasi people, India
 Thomas Jones (minister) (1819–1882), Welsh Independent preacher
 Thomas Sherwood Jones (1872–1972), suffragan bishop of Hulme, Manchester, 1930–1945

Legal
 Thomas Jones (British justice) (1614–1692), British judge
 Thomas Jones (Maryland judge) (1735–1812), justice of the Maryland Court of Appeals
 Thomas A. Jones (1859–1937), associate justice of the Ohio Supreme Court
 Thomas R. Jones (judge) (1913–2006), justice of the New York Supreme Court

Military
 Major Thomas Jones (died 1713), Irish-born immigrant to Long Island, USA
 Thomas Jones, 7th Viscount Ranelagh (1812–1885), proponent of British volunteer force
 Thomas Alfred Jones (1880–1956), British recipient of the Victoria Cross
 Thomas ap Catesby Jones (1790–1858), U.S. Navy officer
 Thomas Jones (Medal of Honor) (1820–1892), American Civil War sailor
 Thomas E. Jones (doctor) (1880–1958), African-American doctor and first lieutenant in the U.S. Army

Poets
 T. Gwynn Jones (1871–1949), Welsh-language poet
 Thomas Henry Jones, known as T. Harri Jones (1921–1965), poet in Britain and Australia
 Thomas Hughes Jones (1895–1966), Welsh poet and writer

Politicians
 Thomas Jones (MP for Wallingford), 15th-century Member of Parliament for Wallingford
 Thomas Jones (died 1558 or 1559), MP for Carmarthenshire and Pembrokeshire
 Thomas Jones (MP for Hereford) (died 1628), MP for Hereford
 Thomas Jones (died 1711), MP for East Grinstead
 Thomas Jones (South Carolina mayor) (1742–1826), fifth intendent (mayor) of Charleston, South Carolina
 Thomas Tyrwhitt Jones (1765–1811), MP for Weymouth and Melcombe Regis
 Thomas McKissick Jones (1816–1892), American politician, Tennessee
 Thomas Laurens Jones (1819–1887), American politician, Kentucky
 Thomas G. Jones (1844–1914), Governor of Alabama, USA
 Thomas Jones, Baron Maelor (1898–1984), British MP for Meirionnydd
 Thomas B. Jones, early 20th-century American politician, Virginia
 Thomas Llewellyn Jones (1872–1946), company director and Queensland politician
 Thomas Artemus Jones (1871–1943), Welsh judge, journalist, nationalist and politician
 Thomas Mardy Jones (1879–1970), British politician and miner

Scientists
 Thomas Jones (mathematician) (1756–1807), British mathematician and academic
 Thomas P. Jones (1774–1848), mechanical engineer and publisher in USA
 Thomas Jones (optician) (1775–1852), British astronomical instrument maker and Fellow of the Royal Society
 Thomas Wharton Jones (1808–1891), ophthalmologist and physiologist
 Thomas Rymer Jones (1810–1880), British surgeon, academic and zoologist
 Thomas Rupert Jones (1819–1911), British geologist
 Thomas David Jones (born 1955), American astronaut

Sportsmen

Association football
 Thomas Jones (footballer, born 1879) (1879–?), outside left (Small Heath)
 Thomas Jones (footballer, born 1884) (1884–1958), Welsh international football inside left (Nottingham Forest)
 Thomas Jones (footballer, born 1885) (1885–?), football centre forward and outside right (Everton, Birmingham City)
 Thomas Jones (footballer, born 1889) (1889–1923), English football goalkeeper (Grimsby Town)
 T. G. Jones (Thomas George Jones, 1917–2004), Welsh international football for Everton

Other sports
 Potsy Jones (Thomas Clinton Jones, 1909–1990), American football player
 Thomas Jones (American football) (born 1978), American football player
 Thomas Babington Jones (1851–1890), Welsh cricketer
 Thomas Baker-Jones (1862–1959), Welsh rugby player
 Thomas Jones (rugby union) (1895–1933), Welsh international rugby union player
 Thomas Jones (wrestler) (born 1982), British wrestler better known as "The UK Kid"

Other
 Thomas Jones (historian) (1732–1792), American Loyalist historian
 Thomas Jones (artist) (1742–1803), landscape painter in Italy and Britain
 Thomas Jones (English publisher) (1791–1882), publisher, bookseller in London, convert to Judaism
 Thomas H. Jones (1806–?), African-American abolitionist
 Thomas Jones (civil engineer) (1809–1892), South Australian pioneer
 Thomas Jones (librarian) (1810–1875), librarian of Chetham's Library, Manchester, Britain
 Thomas Dow Jones (1811–1881), American sculptor, medallist
 Thomas Mason Jones (1833–1873), Irish journalist and political activist
 Thomas John Jones (1874–?), Welsh officer in the British merchant navy
 Thomas E. Jones (university president) (1888–1973), president of Fisk University, U.S., 1926–1946
 Thomas Hudson Jones (1892–1969), American sculptor
 Thomas Hewitt Jones (born 1984), British composer
 Thomas Jesse Jones (1873–1950), Welsh-American sociologist and educational administrator
 T. H. Jones (Thomas Henry Jones, 1855–1929), South Australian organist and music teacher
 T. C. Jones (Thomas Craig Jones, 1920–1971), American female impersonator
 Thomas Jones (born 1980), American rapper, birth name of Rapper Big Pooh
 Arrest of Thomas Jones, 2000 case involving the Philadelphia Police Department
 Twm Siôn Cati (c. 1530–1609), folkloric Welsh outlaw

See also
 Tom Jones (disambiguation)
 Tommy Jones (disambiguation)